Yan Chongnian is a Chinese historian. He was born in Penglai City, Shandong, China in 1934.  He established Beijing Manchu Institute, the first academic institute focussed on the Manchu history.

His publications include Biography of Yuan Chonghuan, True Stories of the 12 Qing Emperors (正説清朝十二帝), and Fall of Ming and Rise of Qing in 60 Years (明亡清興六十年).

External links
Leibold, James. "More Than a Category: Han Supremacism on the Chinese Internet," The China Quarterly (Volume 203, 2010): 539–59.
 Yan Chongnian, homepage at sina.com.
 閻崇年：讀史讀出了敬畏感, People's Daily Online November 2, 2005.
我为什么掌掴阎贼崇年(Why did I slapped Yan Thief Chongnien)

1934 births
Living people
People's Republic of China historians
People from Penglai, Shandong
Historians from Shandong
Writers from Yantai